Law of the Pampas is a 1949 American Western film directed by Nate Watt and written by Harrison Jacobs. The film stars William Boyd, Russell Hayden, Sidney Toler, Steffi Duna, Sidney Blackmer, Pedro de Cordoba and William Duncan. The film was released on November 3, 1939, by Paramount Pictures. Hungarian-born Steffi Duna plays a convincing Argentine senorita and Sidney Toler plays a comic character. Contrary to previously published reports, David Niven does not appear in Law of the Pampas, unbilled or otherwise.

Plot

Hoppy (William Boyd) and his pal Lucky (Russell Hayden) head to South America to look after a herd of cattle sold by Cassidy's boss to an Argentine rancher. Villain Ralph Merritt (Sidney Blackmer) wants to get his mitts on that cattle, and he's not above hiring the scum of the earth to do his bidding. Fortunately, Hoppy, Lucky and their new Latin American buddy Don Fernando (Sidney Toler) make short work of the bad guys in an outsized barroom brawl.

Cast 
 William Boyd as Hopalong Cassidy
 Russell Hayden as Lucky Jenkins
 Sidney Toler as Don Fernando 'Ferdy' Maria Lopez Ramirez
 Steffi Duna as Chiquita
 Sidney Blackmer as Ralph Merritt
 Pedro de Cordoba as Señor Jose Valdez
 William Duncan as Buck Peters
 Anna Demetrio as Dolores Ramirez
 Eddie Dean as Henchman Curly
 Glenn Strange as Henchman Slim 
 Jo Jo La Savio as Ernesto Tito Valdez 
 The King's Men as Singing Cowhands

References

External links 
 
 
 
 

1939 films
American black-and-white films
Films scored by Victor Young
Films directed by Nate Watt
Paramount Pictures films
American Western (genre) films
1939 Western (genre) films
Hopalong Cassidy films
Films set in Argentina
1930s English-language films
1930s American films